Lütsche-Flößgraben is a former canal near Gräfenroda in Thuringia, Germany. It was used for timber rafting from the Thuringian Forest. It has been converted into a hiking trail, opened in 2016.

See also
List of rivers of Thuringia

References

Canals in Germany
Bodies of water of Thuringia